The Lawrie House is a historic house at 600 North 7th Street in West Memphis, Arkansas.  It is a -story wood-frame structure, with a side-gable roof and numerous projecting gables.  The first floor is faced in brick veneer, giving the appearance of a raised basement.  The main facade is dominated by its porch, which has a projecting gable roof supported by four square columns.  Its main entry is flanked by sidelight windows and topped by a four-light lunette window and gable.  The interior features elegant Colonial Revival woodwork.  The house was built in 1939 by J. O. E. Beck, a plantation owner, as a wedding present for his daughter Elizabeth, who married Donald Lawrie.

The house was listed on the National Register of Historic Places in 1996.

See also
National Register of Historic Places listings in Crittenden County, Arkansas

References

External links
 http://www.woodridgecare.com/center-oak-ridge.html

Houses on the National Register of Historic Places in Arkansas
Colonial Revival architecture in Arkansas
Houses completed in 1939
Houses in Crittenden County, Arkansas
National Register of Historic Places in Crittenden County, Arkansas
Buildings and structures in West Memphis, Arkansas